This is a list of Danish television related events from 1971.

Events

Debuts

Television shows

Ending this year

Births
20 February - Camilla Bendix, actress
12 April - Tomas Villum Jensen, actor
30 April - Louise Mieritz, actress
6 July - Mia Lyhne, actress
28 September - Mads Vangsø, comedian & TV & radio host
12 November - Annette Heick, singer, cartoon voice actress, journalist & TV host

Deaths

See also
1971 in Denmark